Akçaray is the tramway line serving in İzmit, which is a city in the province of Kocaeli, Turkey with a population of 367,990. Izmit and Kocaeli are part of Turkey's industrial heartland situation to the east of Istanbul and on the north coast of the Marmara Sea. It has the distinction of being the first and currently the only tramway line in the district of Kocaeli and one of two mass transit lines with the construction of the Gebze Metro.

History
The first tender for the preparation of Akçaray implementation projects was held in January 2014. In the following days, a public vote on the name and color of the tramway line was announced by the Kocaeli Metropolitan and Izmit Municipalities. A tramway wagon was brought to the Anıtpark Square in İzmit and showcased by drawing electricity with a cable.

The tender for the construction of the line was held on May 20, 2015. The general contracting firm Gülermak won the tender for 113 million 990 thousand TL. The groundbreaking ceremony of the project took place on October 19, 2015. Construction work took place between October 2015 and June 2017 when the line opened for public use. During the design phase of the line, controversy arose around plans to repurpose an old railway right of way that had been converted into a pedestrian path into one for the new tramway route.

First phase
The line was put into service with a ceremony on June 17, 2017, with service running every 20 minutes, and on 11 stations spanning the 14.8 km line between Otogar and Sekapark. At the opening ceremony, Ministry of National Defense (Turkey) Fikri Işık announced that the line would be free of charge until July 15, 2017. Headways were reduced to every 15 minutes, 4 days after the lines opening opening. The frequency of trains was arranged to be between 5 and 15 minutes (depending on the hours of the day) with the start of the school term in September.

Second phase
The first 4 stations of the Sekapark to Plajyolu section, the second phase of the line, were put into service on February 9, 2019. In November 2019, 4 more stations were added to the line and extended to Plajyolu. The tender for the extension line to Kuruçeşme was held in 2020.

After the opening of the second stage of the line, it was announced that a free transfer agreement was signed with the cooperatives in the region for the 4 lines in the Alikahya neighborhood towards the Otogar direction.

The 33 meter-long vehicles in service have a total capacity of 290 passengers, including 50 seats and 240 standing. The line, which was opened in June 2017, carried 23 million passengers between the date of its opening and November 2019.

Stations

References

İzmit
Tram transport in Turkey
Izmit